Virginville is a census-designated place in Richmond Township, Berks County, Pennsylvania,  United States. It is located at the junction of PA 143 and Crystal Ridge Road, and is approximately seven miles to the south of the borough of Lenhartsville.

The community was designated as the Virginville Historic District by the National Register of Historic Places in 2000.

As of the 2010 census, the population was 309 residents.

History
The origin of the name Virginville is obscure. Some say it is the English translation of a Native American word, while others believe the community was named for virgin forests in the area. "Virgin" may be an alternate translation of the Indian-named Maiden Creek, which runs through the town and also meets up with Sacony Creek.

The hamlet was designated the Virginville Historic District by the National Register of Historic Places in 2000.

The district encompasses 80 contributing buildings built between 1874 and 1930 with residential, commercial, and institutional buildings which were constructed in a variety of popular architectural styles, including Gothic Revival and Italianate. A primarily residential district, notable non-residential buildings include The Creamery (c. 1875), St. Paul's Chapel (1903), Virginville Hotel (1885), post office (c. 1930), and Balthasar's Garage (1921).

Population and demographics
As of the 2010 census, the population was 309 residents.

Gallery

References

Historic districts on the National Register of Historic Places in Pennsylvania
Gothic Revival architecture in Pennsylvania
Italianate architecture in Pennsylvania
Historic districts in Berks County, Pennsylvania
Census-designated places in Berks County, Pennsylvania
Census-designated places in Pennsylvania
National Register of Historic Places in Berks County, Pennsylvania